Vojka nad Dunajom is a village and municipality in the Dunajská Streda District in the Trnava Region of south-west Slovakia.

History
In the 9th century, the territory of Vojka nad Dunajom became part of the Kingdom of Hungary.
In historical records the village was first mentioned in 1186.
After the Austro-Hungarian army disintegrated in November 1918, Czechoslovak and French troops occupied the area, which despite the majority Hungarian populations of southern Slovakia, and without plebiscite, would later be annexed with the Treaty of Trianon in 1920. Between 1938 and 1945 Vojka nad Dunajom once more became part of Hungary through the First Vienna Award. From 1945 until the Velvet Divorce, it was part of Czechoslovakia. Since then it has been part of Slovakia. The town bears the name of Vajk, the pagan name of St. Stephen of Hungary, first King of Hungary. in 2005, villagers erected a statue of the Saint in front of the local Catholic Church.

Geography
The municipality lies at an altitude of 123 metres and covers an area of 8.212 km². In 2008 t had an estimated population of 467 people.

It is situated on an island between the (old) Danube and the "new Danube", i.e. the Danube channel created by the Gabčíkovo–Nagymaros Dams.

References 

Villages and municipalities in Dunajská Streda District
Hungarian communities in Slovakia